Three ships of the Peruvian Navy have been named BAP Quiñones after Peruvian military aviator José Quiñones Gonzales:

Peruvian Navy ship names